Holder is an unincorporated community in Old Town Township, McLean County, Illinois.

Geography
Holder is located at  (40.4511462, -88.8042368), and is located east of Bloomington.

History
Holder was laid out 7 December 1871 by Charles W. Holder. Holder was a Bloomington land developer who was associated with the development of many towns including Towanda, Illinois, Normal, Illinois. and Lyons, Iowa. The Lafayette, Bloomington and Mississippi Railroad, for which Padua Township had supplied $30,000 worth of bonds. The location of the station came as a surprise to local people who had expected that it would be closer to the center of the Township. A store was moved to the new Town. By 1872 freight service had begun of the railroad. The original town consisted of four blocks on the north side of the depot grounds. The depot was on the south side of the tracks and early grain elevators were on both sides of the tracks.

Demographics
Holder consists of approximately 25 residential dwellings.

Notes

External links
NACo

Unincorporated communities in McLean County, Illinois
Unincorporated communities in Illinois
Populated places established in 1871
1871 establishments in Illinois